Internal Macedonian Revolutionary Organization – Democratic Party for Macedonian National Unity (simplified as VMRO-DPMNE) is a political party in North Macedonia and one of the two major parties in the country, the other being the Social Democratic Union of Macedonia.

The party has presented itself as Christian-democratic, but it is considered nationalist. VMRO-DPMNE's support is based on ethnic Macedonians with some exceptions. The party claims that their goals and objectives are to express the tradition of the Macedonian people on whose political struggle and concepts it is based. Nevertheless, it has formed multiple coalition governments with ethnic minority parties. Under the leadership of Ljubčo Georgievski in its beginning, the party supported the Macedonian independence from Socialist Yugoslavia, and led a policy of closer relationships with Bulgaria. After accused of being a pro-Bulgarian politician, Georgievski broke off from VMRO-DPMNE in 2003. Under the leadership of Nikola Gruevski, the party promoted ultra-nationalist identity politics in the form of antiquization. Its nationalist stances are often perceived also as anti-Albanian. During Gruevski's leadership the party changed from a pro-European and а pro-NATO policy, to a pro-Russian, pro-Serbian and anti-Western one. His government also managed to build a strong anti-EU sentiments in the country. After the resignation of Gruevski in 2017, the new leader Hristijan Mickoski has opposed the Friendship treaty signed with Bulgaria in 2017, and has claimed if he came to power he would revise the Prespa Agreement signed with Greece in 2018, although, stating that he will abide to it. Mickoski characterized the party as "pro-European". The party became the main oppositional force which participated in the 2022 North Macedonia protests, surrounding its accession into the EU.

Background
The first section of the acronym 'VMRO' which forms the party's name derives from the Internal Macedonian Revolutionary Organization, a rebel movement formed in 1893. After undergoing various transformations, the original organization was suppressed after the military coup d'état of 1934, in its headquarters in Bulgaria. At that time the territory of the current North Macedonia was a province called Vardar Banovina, part of the Kingdom of Yugoslavia. As the Bulgarian army entered Yugoslav Macedonia as German satellite during WWII, former IMRO members were active in organizing Bulgarian Action Committees, charged with taking over the local authorities. After Bulgaria switched to the Allied in September 1944, they tried to create a pro-Bulgarian independent Macedonian state under the protectorate of the Third Reich. The VMRO–DPMNE claims ideological descent from the old VMRO, although it was as a whole a pro-Bulgarian grouping. In fact the membership in the IMRO was restricted initially only for Bulgarians, and the region of Macedonia is divided between Bulgaria and North Macedonia today.

Following the death of Yugoslav President Josip Broz Tito in 1980, SFR Yugoslavia began to disintegrate and democratic politics were revived in Macedonia. Many exiles returned to then SR Macedonia from abroad, and a new generation of young Macedonian intellectuals rediscovered the history of Macedonian nationalism. Dragan Bogdanovski who was a proclaimed Macedonian rights movement activist had made a blueprint for a Democratic Party for Macedonian National Unity. He had also made a statute, book of rules, and an instruction of how the party is going to work. Ljubco Georgievski together with Bogdanovski, Boris Zmejkovski and few other activists had agreed to make a party for a future independent Macedonia. In these circumstances it was not surprising that the name of the famed Macedonian rebels was revived. Under the name VMRO–DPMNE, the party was founded on 17 June 1990 in Skopje. In the same year the founders of DPMNE came into contact with the Bulgarian authorities. In Sofia, they were assured that if Serbia invaded Macedonia, Bulgaria would use all necessary means to oppose it.

Rise to power
After the first multi-party elections in 1990, VMRO–DPMNE became the strongest party in the Parliament. It did not form a government because it did not achieve a majority of seats; this forced it to form a coalition with an ethnic Albanian party, but it refused to do so. The party boycotted the second round of the 1994 elections claiming fraud in the first round. After winning the 1998 election, VMRO–DPMNE surprised many people when finally forming a coalition government with an ethnic Albanian party, the Democratic Party of Albanians. After their victory in the elections, they formed a new government with Ljubčo Georgievski as Prime Minister. In 1999, VMRO–DPMNE's candidate Boris Trajkovski was elected President, completing VMRO–DPMNE's takeover. Once in office, Trajkovski adopted a more moderate policy than expected.

VMRO–DPMNE's government was defeated at the 2002 legislative elections. In an alliance with the Liberal Party of Macedonia, VMRO–DPMNE won 28 out of 120 seats. In 2004 Trajkovski died in a plane crash and Branko Crvenkovski was elected President, defeating the VMRO–DPMNE's candidate Saško Kedev.

The first President of the VMRO–DPMNE and its founder was Ljubčo Georgievski, and the former president of the party is Nikola Gruevski. Nevertheless, accused of being pro-Bulgarian politician (a stigma in Macedonia), Georgievski broke off with DPMNE and established the VMRO-NP. The party became the largest party in Parliament again after a net gain of over a dozen seats in the 2006 parliamentary elections. With 44 of 120 seats, the party formed a government in coalition with the Democratic Party of Albanians. On 15 May 2007, the party became an observer-member of the European People's Party.

The party won 2008 early parliamentary elections. In the 120-seat Assembly, VMRO–DPMNE won 63 seats, enough to form its own government, and by that, the party won 4 more years of dominance in the Macedonian Parliament (mandate period 2008-2012) and government control. After the Parliament constituted itself on 21 June 2008, the President Branko Crvenkovski on 23 June 2008 gave the then VMRO–DPMNE's leader and future prime minister Nikola Gruevski the mandate to form the new government (mandate period 2008-2012).

In 2009, the party had another two major successes. While the VMRO–DPMNE-led coalition "For a better Macedonia" won in 56 out of 84 municipalities, the party's presidential candidate Gjorge Ivanov also won the presidential election.

The party won again 2011 early parliamentary elections. VMRO–DPMNE won 56 seats of the 120-seat Assembly of the Republic of Macedonia, the party formed a government in coalition with the Democratic Union for Integration in the Macedonian Parliament (mandate period 2011-2015).

In 2014, early parliamentary elections was call togethers with Macedonian presidential election, VMRO–DPMNE won again 61 seats of the 120-seat Assembly and formed a government in coalition with the Democratic Union for Integration (DUI, mandate period 2014-2018).

Criticism and controversies

Antiquization 

VMRO–DPMNE has been criticised for its "antiquisation" policy (known locally as "Antikvizacija"), in which the country seeks to claim ancient Macedonian figures like Alexander the Great and Philip II of Macedon. The policy has been pursued since the coming to power in 2006, and especially since Macedonia's non-invitation to NATO in 2008, as a way of putting pressure on Greece as well as in an attempt to construct a new identity on the basis of a presumed link to the world of antiquity. Antiquisation policy is facing criticism by academics as it demonstrates feebleness of archaeology and of other historical disciplines in public discourse, as well as a danger of marginalization. The policy has also attracted criticism domestically, by ethnic Macedonians within the country, who see it as dangerously dividing the country between those who identify with classical antiquity and those who identify with the country's Slavic culture. Ethnic Albanians saw it as an attempt to marginalize them and exclude them from the national narrative. The policy, which also claims as ethnic Macedonians figures considered national heroes in Bulgaria, such as Todor Aleksandrov and Ivan Mihailov, has drawn criticism from Bulgaria, and is regarded to have a negative impact on the international position of the country. Foreign diplomats warned that the policy has reduced international sympathy for Macedonia's position in the naming dispute with Greece. SDSM was opposed to the project and has alleged that the monuments in the project could have cost six to ten times less than what the government paid, which may already have exceeded 600 million euros.

Anti-Greek attitudes 
VMRO-DPMNE has been criticized for its hard-line stance against the Prespa Agreement that was reached in June 2018 between the Republic of Macedonia and Greece, which resolved the long-standing Macedonia naming dispute by renaming the country as North Macedonia and recognizing that Macedonian culture and language are distinct and unrelated to ancient Hellenic civilization. On 16 October 2018, US Assistant Secretary of State Wess Mitchell sent a letter to VMRO-DPMNE leader Hristijan Mickoski, in which he expresses the disappointment of the United States with the positions of the party's leadership, including him personally, regarding its position against the Prespa agreement and asks to "set aside partisan interests" and work to get the name change approved. Mickoski expressed his hope that the Republic of Macedonia will be very soon a part of the NATO and EU families, "but proud and dignified, not humiliated, disfigured and disgraced." However in 2019, Mickoski has been criticized by the SDSM Deputy Foreign Minister Andrej Žernovski, that he has insisted, if he becomes a Prime Minister, after receiving a start date for accession negotiations on the EU membership of North Macedonia, the friendship agreements with the neighboring Greece and Bulgaria, signed by Zoran Zaev's government, would be denounced. According to the analyst Erol Rizaov, Mickoski's long-term goal is really the denouncement of both agreements.

Anti-Bulgarian attitudes 
The party claims descent from the old VMRO which was a pro-Bulgarian organization, thus in its first leadership headed by Ljubčo Georgievski during 1990s, there were mainly Bulgarophiles. They were inclined to revise the anti-Bulgarian attitudes in the country, based on the negative historical narrative, inherited from Communist Yugoslavia. Under the leadership of the next party-leader Gruevski, there was not even a single pro-Bulgarian activist on a high-ranking position. Gruevski, started an open confrontation with Bulgaria and consistently got closer to Serbia and its policy. His successor Mickoski, has continued this line and took an openly bulgariophobic stance. The party became the main force in the 2022 North Macedonia protests against the start of the negotiation process of North Macedonia and the EU, based on reconciliation with Bulgaria. In August 2022, Mickoski vowed to leave the politics forever, if Bulgarians were included in the country's constitution, a mandatory requirement included in the negotiating framework with the EU. In September 2022, the party initiated the holding of a referendum under which the friendship treaty between Bulgaria and North Macedonia would be denounced. According to the former Macedonian Prime Minister Vlado Bučkovski, Russia stays behind this anti-Bulgarian hysteria, aiming to prevent the EU-path of the country.

In 2012, as part of the controversial VMRO-DPMNE's project Skopje 2014, a statue of the member of the IMRO Simeon Radev, who was also a Bulgarian diplomat, was installed on the building of the Ministry of Foreign Affairs. The statue was later taken down, explaining that it had been a mistake. The explanation was that Radev's relation with Macedonia was only as his place of birth, while his entire life's work was dedicated to the Bulgarian state. In April 2022, a Bulgarian club named after the last leader of the historical IMRO, Ivan Mihailov (1924-1934), was officially opened in Bitola. After its opening, the club was set on fire, and the VMRO-DPMNE leader demanded that the arsonist, who was arrested, be released. The deputy chairman of the party Alexander Nikoloski expressed later his support to the decision of the Commission for Protection against Discrimination, which announces that the club "Ivan Mihailov" is discriminative towards the citizens of the country on national and ethnic grounds. VMRO-DPMNE deputy Rasela Mizrahi declared also the last leader of the organization whose name it bears to be a fascist. Later, the party submitted a bill demanding that such names be banned for use in the country to increase distancing from fascism, Nazism and National Socialism.

Pro-Serbian attitudes 
Under the leadership of Nikola Gruevski VMRO-DPMNE would embrace a pro-Serbian policy. In 2015 the former Prime Minister and leader of the VMRO-NP, Ljubčo Georgievski espoused in an interview for Radio Free Europe his opinion, that the then government had a clear goal: to keep the country closer to Serbia, and at some future stage to join the northern neighbor. According to him a classical pro-Yugoslav policy of Serbianisation was being conducted, where confrontation with all the other neighbors was taking place, but the border between Macedonian and Serbian national identity had been erased. "Stop the Serbian assimilation of the Macedonian nation" was the motto of the billboards that were placed then on Skopje streets, through which the Party launched a campaign for preserving the Macedonian national identity. The pro-governmental press claimed that the "Bulgarian" Georgievski organised a new provocation. As a result the billboards were removed quickly by the VMRO-DPMNE authorities.

Criminal scandals 

The party does not have a good reputation in the Western world. It is often associated with neo-fascism and with Marine Le Pen's party in France (i.e National Rally). VMRO-DPMNE was widely accused of nepotism and authoritarianism and was involved in a series of wiretapping, corruption and money-laundering scandals, with the Macedonian Special Prosecution ordering in 2017 a series of investigations against the party's former leader and ex-PM Nikola Gruevski, as well as ministers and other high-ranked officials, for involvement in illegal activities. In 2018, and amid ongoing investigations, a Court froze the party's property assets. Gruevski himself was sentenced in 2018 but fled when he was ordered to serve his prison sentence. Nevertheless, Gruevski has remained an honorary chairman of the party till July 2020.

Georgievski 
Former Macedonian Prime Minister and one of the party's founders and its first leader Ljubčo Georgievski has espoused in an interview with Radio Free Europe in 2012, that VMRO-DPMNE is his personal failure. According to him, it became a fake party without any ideology. Georgievski has announced that he feels obliged to nail this party every single day. According to him, if the party policy of fabricating hoaxes about the Macedonian past continues, the ethnic Macedonians will gradually lose the support of all ethnic communities in the country.
Georgievski still insists 10 years later, that it continues to be hidden by the modern Macedonian historians that the historical IMRO-activists were Bulgarians. The IMRO victims for the idea of an Independent Macedonia are proclaimed traitors, while the communist spies from UDBA are seen as heroes. That is what VMRO-DPMNE keeps doing, and that is a total paradox. According to him, after his departure, agents of the former Yugoslav security service were massively introduced into the party's leadership.

Youth Force Union 
Youth Force Union, also known as UMS, is the youth wing organization of the VMRO-DPMNE. It considers itself a continuation of historical youth organizations which spread the ideals of VMRO for independent Macedonia.

A number of projects arising from the Youth Force Union were conducted in the past 20 years. Formed in 1991, the most remarkable and influential President of YFU was Filip Petrovski; he was its leader in the period 1997–2000, and member of parliament 1998–2001.

Electoral history

Presidential elections

Assembly elections

See also
:Category:VMRO-DPMNE politicians

References

Further reading

External links
Official website 

1990 establishments in the Socialist Republic of Macedonia
Anti-communist parties
Christian democratic parties in Europe
Conservative parties in North Macedonia
Eastern Orthodox political parties
Internal Macedonian Revolutionary Organization
International Democrat Union member parties
Macedonian nationalism
Member parties of the European People's Party
National conservative parties
Nationalist parties in North Macedonia
Political parties established in 1990
Political parties in Yugoslavia
Right-wing populism in North Macedonia
Right-wing populist parties